Sphagoeme is a genus of beetles in the family Cerambycidae, containing the following species:

 Sphagoeme acuta Martins & Galileo, 1994
 Sphagoeme aurivillii Gounelle, 1909
 Sphagoeme lineata Martins, 1981
 Sphagoeme nigrotibialis Martins, 1973
 Sphagoeme ochracea Fisher, 1927
 Sphagoeme paraensis Martins, 1977
 Sphagoeme sahlbergi Aurivillius, 1893
 Sphagoeme suturalis Martins, 1977

References

Xystrocerini